Nadiia Kunina (born 29 March 2000) is a Ukrainian footballer who plays as a midfielder for Linköpings playing in Sweden's Damallsvenskan. She has played for the Ukraine women's national team.

Career
Kunina has been capped for the Ukraine national team, appearing for the team during the 2019 FIFA Women's World Cup qualifying cycle.

International goals
''Scores and results list Ukraine's goal tally first.

References

External links
 
 
 

2000 births
Living people
Ukrainian women's footballers
Women's association football midfielders
WFC Zhytlobud-1 Kharkiv players
Ukraine women's international footballers
Ukrainian expatriate women's footballers
Ukrainian expatriate sportspeople in Sweden
Expatriate women's footballers in Sweden